Government of Juan Manuel Moreno may refer to:

First government of Juan Manuel Moreno (2019–2022)
Second government of Juan Manuel Moreno (2022–present)